Heritage Park is located in the city of Irvine in Orange County, California. The park sits next to Heritage Park Regional Library on the corner of Yale and Walnut Avenue(s), and is adjacent to Irvine High School. It was for decades recognized by its iconic wooden "water tower" slide, which stood three stories tall. Originally built in 1976, the decaying structure was removed in the mid-2000s following a re-design of the play area. The park was also known to children of the 1980s for its tractor-tire maze, which was removed in the early 1990s to make way for a playground and basketball courts.

Pond
The pond sits in the south-east corner of the park. Several types of ducks call the lagoon their home. The walkway around the pond is a popular attraction.

Park Amenities
 3 pools
 2 multi-use buildings
 4 restrooms
 11 drinking fountains
 2 child play areas
 1 open play area
 1 amphitheater
 1 lake/pond
 2 concession stands
 3 lighted soccer fields
 12 lighted tennis courts
 3 lighted basketball courts
 1 volleyball court
 2 lighted racquetball courts
 2 lighted ball diamonds
 22 barbecues
 1 group picnic area
 29 picnic tables
 Electrical outlets

Geography of Irvine, California
Parks in Orange County, California
Municipal parks in California
Unreferenced Orange County, California articles